Bric-a-Brac is a British children's television series devised by Michael Cole and Nick Wilson, and starring well known children's television presenter Brian Cant. It was produced by the BBC and originally ran from 1 October until 5 November 1980, with another series from 18 August to 29 September 1982. It was repeated frequently until 1989.

The programme was set in a fictitious junk shop, with its shopkeeper played by Cant, who would deliver a monologue to camera. Each episode centred on a particular letter of the alphabet, with different items beginning with that letter found and discussed by the shopkeeper.  Cant's script made heavy use of alliteration, and made use of tongue-twisters.  At the end of each episode, he would wind up and set off a traditional clockwork toy, upon which the camera would focus whilst the credits rolled.

Presenter
The programme was presented by Brian Cant throughout its run.

Theme Music
The theme music is an edited version of the track "Keystone Capers 2" by Eric Peters from the KPM LP Electrosonic (1972).

References

External links 
Bric-A-Brac at www.forthechildren.org.uk
Bric-A-Brac at IMDb

BBC children's television shows
1980 British television series debuts
1982 British television series endings
1980s British children's television series